was an Imperial Japanese naval commander during the Pacific War and the author of the IJN manual on torpedo attack techniques, notable for his skill in torpedo warfare and night fighting.  Hara was the only IJN destroyer captain at the start of World War II to survive the entire war and his memoirs serve as an important source for historians.

Early life
Tameichi Hara was born on October 16, 1900 in a suburb of Takamatsu City on the island of Shikoku.  A native of Kagawa Prefecture and of samurai descent, Hara graduated with the 49th class from the Imperial Japanese Naval Academy at Etajima in 1921. In 1932 Hara was assigned as a surface warfare instructor and wrote a torpedo attack manual that was accepted as official doctrine. He began the war as the captain of destroyer .

Military career

Hara commanded a Japanese destroyer or destroyer division in many significant Pacific sea battles. As captain of the Amatsukaze Commander Hara participated in the Battle of the Java Sea, the sinking of the submarine , and the occupation of Christmas Island. Under his command, Amatsukaze also took part in the Battle of Midway in June 1942 and the Battle of the Eastern Solomons in August 1942. On 13 November 1942 Hara’s Amatsukaze sank the  during the Naval Battle of Guadalcanal but was severely damaged in turn after Hara left his searchlights on too long and drew intense fire from the light cruiser .

After Amatsukaze returned to Japan for repairs Hara was promoted to captain and given the command of Destroyer Division 27, flying his flag aboard . While this was technically a four-ship formation the demands on the Imperial navy were such that Hara's ships rarely operated together.  While serving aboard Shigure, Hara was involved in several fierce naval engagements during the latter part of the Solomon Islands Campaign. While on a re-supply mission through Blackett Straight on 2 August 1943, Hara noticed a fireball exploding near leading destroyer Amagiri and ordered Shigure's crew to shoot at the burning wreckage of Lt. John F. Kennedy's Motor Torpedo Boat PT-109.  During the Battle of Vella Gulf on 6–7 August Shigure was the only one of four Japanese destroyers to escape, though she was later found to have been hit by a torpedo that failed to explode.

Although undamaged in the Bombing of Rabaul (November 1943), Shigure was ordered to back to Sasebo for a long overdue refit. Hara was relieved of his command and reassigned as senior torpedo instructor at the Naval Torpedo School at Oppama near Yokosuka to teach students in the Imperial Japanese Navy's belated Motor Torpedo Boat program. Hara was quickly frustrated with the lack of effective equipment as well as the lack of leadership in the navy and army. He hastily wrote a letter intended for Emperor Hirohito urging him to fire the heads of the army and navy and seek peace as the war was lost and hand delivered it to Hirohito's younger brother Nobuhito, Prince Takamatsu at the Navy Ministry. Despite the potentially grave consequences of this action Hara did not hear anything further on the matter.

Hara's last sortie was as captain of the light cruiser  as flagship of the destroyer screen accompanying  on her fateful last mission as part of Operation Ten-Go. He ended the war at Kawatana training Japanese sailors to operate Shinyo suicide boats, where he witnessed firsthand the effects of the second atomic bombing.

During the war Captain Hara participated in 14 major actions:
 Air raid against American naval base at Davao on Mindanao (Philippines), 8 December 1941, escorting aircraft carrier Ryūjō; a complete fiasco, as no American ships were found (on Amatsukaze)
 Invasion of Davao on 20 December 1941, an easy Japanese victory, as the base was already almost completely evacuated (on Amatsukaze)
 Invasion of Ambon Island, 30 January-3 February 1942, a Japanese victory (on Amatsukaze)
 Battle of the Java Sea, 27–28 February 1942, a great Japanese victory (on Amatsukaze)
 Invasion of Christmas Island, 31 March 1942, an easy Japanese victory as British garrison surrendered without resistance (on Amatsukaze)
 Battle of Midway, 4–7 June 1942, a decisive Japanese defeat (on Amatsukaze)  
 Battle of the Eastern Solomons, 24–25 August 1942, a serious Japanese defeat (on Amatsukaze)
 Battle of the Santa Cruz Islands, 26 October 1942, a costly Japanese victory (on Amatsukaze)
 Naval Battle of Guadalcanal, 13 November 1942, a Japanese tactical victory but a very serious strategic defeat (on Amatsukaze)
 Battle of Vella Gulf, 6–7 August 1943, a crushing Japanese defeat (on Shigure)
 Battle off Horaniu, 17 August 1943, inconclusive (on Shigure)
 Battle of Vella Lavella, 6 October 1943, the last Japanese naval victory of the war (on Shigure)
 Battle of Empress Augusta Bay, 1–2 November 1943, a heavy Japanese defeat (on Shigure)
 Operation Ten-Go, 7 April 1945, a crushing Japanese defeat (on Yahagi)

List of Victories:

, US submarine damaged by Hara's destroyer Amatsukaze on 1 March 1942, and which was later sunk by other Japanese destroyers on 3 March 1942, Java Sea.
, US destroyer sunk by Amatsukaze in torpedo attack during the Battle of Guadalcanal, 12 November 1942.
, US light cruiser damaged by a torpedo from Amatsukaze, and sunk the next day by submarine I-26 as Juneau limped back to base.  Battle of Guadalcanal, 13 November 1942.
, US destroyer severely damaged and put out of action for six months by torpedoes fired by destroyers Shigure and Samidare under Hara's command.  Battle of Vella LaVella, 6–7 October 1943.

Approximately ten US, British, and Australian aircraft were shot down by the destroyer Shigure and light cruiser Yahagi while under Hara's command, though not all of these claims are verified by Allied sources.

Later life and memoirs
Postwar Hara commanded merchant ships which transported salt.  Hara was the only IJN destroyer captain at the start of World War II who survived the war. This left him the sole surviving witness to several important meetings and conferences which he recounted in his memoirs.  Hara's memoirs were translated into English and French and became an important reference for the Japanese perspective for historians writing about the Pacific Campaign of World War II. In his memoir, Hara objects to compulsory suicide as official doctrine, which he saw as a violation of bushido values.  His personal doctrines demonstrate why he survived the war and the Japanese lost it —- they were inflexible, and he was not. His doctrines were "Never ever do the same thing twice" and "If he hits you high, then hit him low; if he hits you low, then hit him high," the latter was also a maxim of Douglas MacArthur's. Hara criticizes his superiors for using cavalry tactics to fight naval battles; never understanding the implications of air power; dividing their forces in the face of enemy forces of unknown strength; basing tactics on what they thought their enemy would do; failing to appreciate the speed with which the enemy could develop new weapons and accepting a war of attrition with a foe more capable of maintaining it. However, he does make some crucial mistakes in this memoir such as claiming that Kirishima sunk USS San Francisco at the Battle of Guadalcanal despite the fact that San Francisco was scrapped the same year his memoir was published.

Personal life
Hara had three children with his wife Chizu: two daughters Keiko and Yoko, and a son, Mikito, who was born shortly before the start of hostilities.

Notes

References

External links
Recall Roster
CombinedFleet.com biography of Hara

Japanese military personnel of World War II
Imperial Japanese Navy officers
1900 births
1980 deaths
Military personnel from Kagawa Prefecture
Battle of Midway